Locations are a type of administrative region in Kenya. Locations are a third level subdivision below counties and sub-counties. Locations are further subdivided into sub-locations. At the 1999 census there were 2,427 locations and 6,612 sublocations in Kenya.

Each division in Kenya is divided into some locations. Locations often, but not necessarily, coincide with electoral wards. Locations are usually named after their central village or town. Many larger towns consist of several locations. 

Each location has a chief, appointed by the state.

References 

Subdivisions of Kenya